Yeniköy ("New Village"; in Greek known as Neohorion or Neohori or Nihori), sometimes also referred to as Yeni Kioi, is a neighbourhood in the Sarıyer district of Istanbul, Turkey. It is located on the European shores of the Bosphorus strait, between the neighbourhoods of İstinye and Tarabya.

General information
The settlement in the area began in the 16th century and became a prestigious place of residence in the 19th century.

The Köybaşı Caddesi (Köybaşı Avenue) runs through the neighbourhood close to the Bosphorus shoreline. Nearby neighborhoods of Yalılar, Bağlar Mevkii, Kalender, as well as sections of Ferahevler are considered within the borders of Yeniköy. 

Yeniköy was until the 1955 Istanbul pogrom a neighbourhood with a considerable Greek population as well as Armenian and Jewish communities. The Surp Asdvadzadzin Armenian church and the Yeniköy Synagogue survive to this day.

Notable buildings and sites
The suburb is home to several exclusive yalı houses that used to be owned by the prominent figures of the Ottoman era. The small Osman Reis mosque was built by Alexander Vallaury in 1904 on the site of a 17th-century mosque. Vallaury also designed the yalı of Ahmed Afif Pasha behind it, where Agatha Christie stayed as a guest in 1933 while writing Murder on the Orient Express.

There are several Christian churches in the neighbourhood. The Greek Orthodox church of Dormition of the Mother of God (Panayia Kumariotisa Rum Ortodoks Kilisesi, Koybaşı Cad. No. 108) was built in 1837 at the request of Sultan Mahmud II′s personal physician Stefanos Karatheodori. His and his son Alexander Karatheodori Pasha′s tombstones are next to the wooden bell tower west of the church.

Education
Yeniköy is served by Yeniköy İlkokulu and Yeniköy Mehmetçik İlköğretim Okulu as its main primary and middle education centers respectively. Tarabya British Schools has its Yeniköy campus there.

Notable people
Peter the Byzantine, who served the Ecumenical Patriarchate of Constantinople as Domestikos, Lambadarios, and Arch-cantor was born here.

The Egyptian Greek poet Constantine Cavafy lived here together with his parents in 1882–1885 as an adolescent; his bust is in the yard of the Panagia church. In his poem "Nichori" (1885), he praises the place.

References

Further reading
 Türker, Orhan: Nihori´den Yeniköy´e. Bir Boğaziçi Köyünün Hikayesi. Sel Yayıncılık, Istanbul. 2004.

External links

Bosphorus
Fishing communities in Turkey
Historic Jewish communities
Neighbourhoods of Sarıyer